Antye Greie (aka AGF or Poemproducer) is a vocalist, musician, composer, producer, and new media artist.

Life
Greie was born and raised in East Germany. Her work involves speech combined with electronic music. She works on sound installations, moving image, audio visualization and real time video processing. In 2009, as part of the collective The Lappetites, she staged the multimedia opera Fathers in Berlin Haus der Kulturen der Welt.

In 2011 she initiated the arts organization Hai Art on the island of Hailuoto becoming the curator.

Greie has written two feature film scores, theater and dance plays.

Greie performs as AGF (solo), AGF/DELAY (with Vladislav Delay), with Zavoloka, The Dolls (with Vladislav Delay and Craig Armstrong), Laub (with Jotka), and The Lappetites (with Eliane Radigue, Kaffe Matthews and Ryoko Akama /Kuwajima).

Personal life
She lived in Berlin from 1996 to 2008. In 2008 she moved to Hailuoto, Finland. She is married to Sasu Rippati.

Discography

LONGPLAYER ONLY

 AGF, Commissioned Work, 2019, digital, streaming
 AGF & Various, DISSIDENTOVA, 2018, CD Book
 AGF, SOLIDICITY,2017, digital, streaming
 AGF, Kon:3p>UTION to: e[VOL]ution, 2016, AGF Producktion, CD
 AGF & Various, A Deep Mysterious Tone, 2015, AGF Producktion, CD Book
 A-symmetry, I Am Life, 2014, AGF Producktion, CD
 Greie & Huber, Ausweg, 2014, AGF Producktion, digital album
 AGF & Various, Kuuntele, 2013, AGF Producktion, CD Book
 AGF, Source Voice, 2013, LINE [Segments], CD
 AGF, Beatnadel, 2011, AGF Producktion, CD
 AGF & Various, Gedichterbe, 2011, AGF Producktion, CD Book
 AGF & Craig Armstrong, Orlando, 2011, AGF Producktion, CD
 AGF, Filter, 2010, AGF Producktion, digital
 Greie Gut Fraktion, Baustelle, 2010, Monika Enterprise, CD
 Antye Greie aka AGF, Einzelkaempfer, 2009, AGF Producktion, CD
 AGF/DELAY, Symptoms, 2009, B-Pitch, CD
 AGF, Dance Floor Drachen, 2008, AGF Producktion, digital
 AGF, Words Are Missing, 2008, AGF Producktion, CD
 LAUB, Deinetwegen, 04/2007, AGF Producktion, CD
 Zavoloka & AGF, Nature Never Produces the Same Beat Twice, 04/2006, AGF Producktion & Nexsound, CD
 AGF.3 & Sue.C, Mini Movies, 02/2006, Asphodel, CD
 The Dolls, The Dolls, 2005, Huume Recordings, CD
 AGF/DELAY, Explode, 02/2005, AGF Producktion, CD
 The Lappetites, Before The Libretto, 10/2005, Quecksilber, CD
 AGF, Language Is The Most, 2004, Quecksilber, CD
 AGF, Westernization Completed, 11/2003, Orthlong Musork, CD, 06/2004, AGF Producktion, CD
 LAUB, Filesharing, 02/2002, Kitty-Yo, CD
 AGF, Head Slash Bauch, 01/2002, Orthlong Musork, CD/LP
 LAUB, Intuition Remixes, 09/1999, Kitty-Yo, CD
 LAUB, Unter anderen Bedingungen als Liebe, 05/1999, CD
 Tritop, Rosenwinkel, 1998, Infracom, CD/LP
 LAUB, Kopflastig, 09/1997, Kitty-Yo, CD
 LAUB, Miniversum, 1997, Kitty-Yo, CDS
 AGF / Mama Baer & Kommissar Hjuler / Marc Hurtado, Ich werde sein, 01/2018, Psych.KG, LP
discography – all titles listed

Awards, grants, references
 Ars Electronica Award of Distinction in Digital Music 2004
 Ars Electronica Jury of Digital Music in Linz 2005
 The Wire, Cover story May 2006 issue
  Jury member of Radio Art in Murcia, Spain 2009 
 Deutscher Musikrat, production grant “Gedichterbe” 2010 
 Finnish Arts Council, One year Artist Grant 2011 
 Ars Electronica Jury of Digital Music in Linz 2012
 Ars Electronica Honorary mention of “Gedichterbe” in Digital Music 2013
 Case Pyhajoki project grant from Kone Foundatation for 2013 
 Finnish Arts Council, 0,5 year artist grant by 2014

References

External links
poemproducer – AGF's website
Antye Greie – Antye Greie's list of works
Visuals –  for Vladislav Delay
The Lappetites – The Lappetites website
Antye Greie at IMDB

Living people
German electronic musicians
1969 births
Women in electronic music
Kitty-Yo artists